Karasi (born 1995) is an Australian Racing Hall of Fame champion steeplechase horse bred in Ireland. The horse is best known for winning the world's richest steeplechase race, the Nakayama Grand Jump at Nakayama Racecourse, Japan for three consecutive years (2005, 2006, 2007). He was a top flat performer as a younger horse, with his best performance being a fourth in the 2001 Melbourne Cup, in which he was the highest placed Australian trained runner. He suffered a career-ending injury while in Japan preparing for his fourth Grand Jump.

Karasi was indicated to Australian Racing Hall of Fame in 2018.

See also 
 Repeat winners of horse races
 List of millionaire racehorses in Australia

References

External links
Karasi Pedigree Query

1995 racehorse births
Thoroughbred family 16-d
Racehorses bred in Ireland
Racehorses trained in the United Kingdom
Racehorses trained in Australia
National Hunt racehorses